David Frain (born 11 October 1962) is an English former professional footballer who played as a midfielder, making over 250 career appearances.

Career
Born in Sheffield, Frain played for Norton Woodseats, Sheffield United, Rochdale, Stockport County, Mansfield Town and Stalybridge Celtic.

Honours
Individual
PFA Team of the Year: 1990–91 Fourth Division

References

1962 births
Living people
English footballers
Sheffield United F.C. players
Rochdale A.F.C. players
Stockport County F.C. players
Mansfield Town F.C. players
Stalybridge Celtic F.C. players
English Football League players
Association football midfielders